Saint-Hippolyte or Saint-Hippolyte-sur-le-Doubs is a commune in the department of Doubs, in the eastern French region of Bourgogne-Franche-Comté.

Geography

Population

Personalities
Saint-Hippolyte was the birthplace of:
 Jacques Courtois (1621-1676?), Jesuit and painter
 Guillaume Courtois (1628–1679), painter and brother of Jacques

Gallery

See also
 Communes of the Doubs department

References

External links

 Saint-Hippolyte on the regional Web site 
 Official website 

Communes of Doubs